The Congress of the State of Chiapas is the legislative branch of  the government of the State of Chiapas. It was constituted for the first time after the state's accession to Mexico on January 5, 1825. The Congress is the governmental deliberative body of Chiapas, which is equal to, and independent of, the executive.

At present it is composed of an assembly of 40 deputies, 24 of whom are elected on a first-past-the-post basis, one for each district in which the entity is divided. The rest is elected through a system of proportional representation. Deputies are elected to serve for a three-year term. Its headquarters are in the state capital, Tuxtla Gutiérrez.

See also
List of Mexican state congresses

References

External links
Official website

Government of Chiapas
Chiapas
Chiapas